I Love Lucy is an American television sitcom starring Lucille Ball, Desi Arnaz, Vivian Vance, and William Frawley. The black-and-white series originally ran from October 15, 1951, to May 6, 1957, on CBS. All 180 episodes aired on Mondays.

In total 180 episodes of I Love Lucy were produced, plus a pilot episode. The pilot, which was not made for broadcast and did not air as part of the show's original run, is generally not counted as one of the episodes and therefore listed separately for reference. It is, however, available on DVD and Blu-ray releases of the first season. Following I Love Lucy, a further 13 one hour-long episodes were produced under the title of The Lucille Ball-Desi Arnaz Show (later and more commonly known in syndication as The Lucy–Desi Comedy Hour) with the same cast and later packaged as seasons 7, 8 & 9 under the I Love Lucy series.

Series overview

Episodes

Unaired pilot
This unaired pilot was considered lost until the widow of Pepito Pérez (the clown who appeared in it) notified CBS that she owned a copy, given to Pérez by Desi Arnaz and Lucille Ball in gratitude for his performance.

The pilot was first broadcast on CBS television stations nationwide on Monday, April 30, 1990, 39 years after it was originally filmed.

Season 1 (1951–52)

Season 2 (1952–53)

Season 3 (1953–54)

Season 4 (1954–55)

Season 5 (1955–56)

Season 6 (1956–57)

The Lucy–Desi Comedy Hour episodes

After season six, the series was renamed The Lucille Ball-Desi Arnaz Show for its original broadcast run and rather than airing as weekly half hour series, hour-long episodes were produced to run occasionally during the year. There were thirteen hour-long shows.  The first five were broadcast as specials during the 1957-58 television season.  The other eight episodes were broadcast as part of the Westinghouse Desilu Playhouse from October 6, 1958, to April 1, 1960. The series was subsequently broadcast in syndication as The Lucy-Desi Comedy Hour and We Love Lucy. This show had the same cast as I Love Lucy, employed many of the other same actors, and featured many famous guest-stars.  Of the original I Love Lucy cast, besides the principals, only Lucy's mother appeared in any Comedy Hour episode.  She appears in season 3, episode 2 'The Ricardos Go To Japan' as Little Ricky's babysitter.

Season 1 (1957–58)

Season 2 (1958–59)

Season 3 (1959–60)

References

Further reading

 
I Love Lucy